Vincent Manceau (born 10 July 1989) is a French professional footballer who plays as a full-back for  club Guingamp.

Career
Born in Angers, Manceau has played for Angers SCO since he was 6 in 1995. He started his professional career as a defensive midfielder, later being moved the full-back position. In June 2016, he agreed a contract extension until 2020 with the club.

On 21 July 2022, Manceau signed a contract with Guingamp for two years with an option for a third year.

Career statistics

Honours 
Angers
 Coupe de France runner-up: 2016–17

References

External links
 
 
 
 
 Vincent Manceau profile at Foot-National.com

1989 births
Living people
Sportspeople from Angers
Association football defenders
French footballers
Angers SCO players
En Avant Guingamp players
Ligue 1 players
Ligue 2 players
Footballers from Pays de la Loire